Gerardo Alcoba Rebollo (born 25 November 1984 in Montevideo) is a retired Uruguayan professional footballer.

International career
Alcoba has made two appearances for the senior Uruguay national football team, and his debut was a friendly against Turkey on 20 August 2008.

Honours

Club
Santos Laguna
Liga MX: Clausura 2018

References

External links
 
 Profile - UNAM

1984 births
Living people
People from Paso de los Toros
Association football defenders
Uruguayan footballers
Uruguayan expatriate footballers
Uruguay international footballers
Montevideo Wanderers F.C. players
Peñarol players
Club Atlético Colón footballers
L.D.U. Quito footballers
Club Universidad Nacional footballers
Club Atlético Tigre footballers
Santos Laguna footballers
Uruguayan Primera División players
Argentine Primera División players
Liga MX players
Expatriate footballers in Argentina
Expatriate footballers in Ecuador
Expatriate footballers in Mexico
Uruguayan expatriate sportspeople in Argentina
Uruguayan expatriate sportspeople in Ecuador
Uruguayan expatriate sportspeople in Mexico